was a Japanese writer of the Meiji period. Katsuyori was the son of Imada Manma (今田 萬橘), the official armorer of the Aizu domain. Upon entering the University of Tokyo in 1893, Katsuyori was assisted by then-president Yamakawa Kenjirō, a fellow Aizu native.

References

Tōdō Toshihisa, "Saitō Hajime Kanren Jinbutsu Jiten". pp. 193–206 of Shinsengumi Saitō Hajime no Subete. Tōkyō: Shin Jinbutsu Ōraisha, 2003, p. 194.

1878 births
1950 deaths
Japanese writers